Jörgen Johansson (1947 – 13 June 2010) was a Swedish Centre Party politician, member of the Riksdag since 2002.

References

1947 births
2010 deaths
Members of the Riksdag 2002–2006
Members of the Riksdag 2006–2010
Members of the Riksdag from the Centre Party (Sweden)